The 1982 Campionati Internazionali di Sicilia, also known as the Sicilian Open, was a men's tennis tournament played on outdoor clay courts in Palermo, Italy that was part of the 1982 Volvo Grand Prix. It was the fourth edition of the tournament and took place from 13 September until 19 September 1982. Unseeded Mario Martínez won the singles title.

Finals

Singles
 Mario Martínez defeated  John Alexander 6–4, 7–5
 It was Martínez' 1st singles title of the year and the 3rd of his career.

Doubles
 Enzo Vattuone /  Gianni Marchetti defeated  José Luis Damiani /  Diego Pérez 6–4, 6–7, 6–3

References

External links
 ITF tournament edition details

Campionati Internazionali di Sicilia
Campionati Internazionali di Sicilia
Campionati Internazionali di Sicilia